Makhsar (also Romanized as Makhser and Mokhsar; also known as Mahser) is a village in Rud Pish Rural District, in the Central District of Fuman County, Gilan Province, Iran. At the 2006 census, its population was 189, in 56 families.

References 

Populated places in Fuman County